Mams Slough is a stream in Audrain County in the U.S. state of Missouri.

According to folk etymology, the creek was named for the fact a "mam slew" (i.e. a woman hunted) near its banks.

See also
List of rivers of Missouri

References

Rivers of Audrain County, Missouri
Rivers of Missouri